The Cairns rainbowfish (Cairnsichthys rhombosomoides) is a species of rainbowfish endemic to Australia. This species is endemic to the wet tropics of north eastern Queensland from the Daintree River and Cape Tribulation in the north south to Innisfail where its occurs in shallow, fast flowing, shady streams over sandy substrates where the roots of trees, woody debris, leaf litter, undercut banks and hydrophytes provide cover.

References

Further reading
 Hammer, Michael P. ; Gerald R. Allen; Keith C. Martin; Mark Adams; Brendan C. Ebner; Tarmo A. Raadik; and Peter J. Unmack (2018). Revision of the Australian Wet Tropics Endemic Rainbowfish Genus Cairnsichthys (Atheriniformes: Melanotaeniidae), with Description of A New Species. Zootaxa. 4413(2); 271–294. 

Cairns rainbowfish
Vulnerable fauna of Australia
Cairns rainbowfish
Taxonomy articles created by Polbot